Łabędź (Polish for "swan") may refer to:

Places
Łabędź, Kuyavian-Pomeranian Voivodeship (north-central Poland)
Łabędź, Silesian Voivodeship (south Poland)
Łabędź, West Pomeranian Voivodeship (north-west Poland)

People with the surname
Leopold Łabędź (1920–1993), Anglo-Polish journalist

See also
Łabędź coat of arms

Polish-language surnames